Alefosio Tatola (born 28 January 1995 in Australia) is an Australian born Tongan rugby union player who plays for the  in Super Rugby. His playing position is prop. He was named in the Waratahs squad for the 2021 Super Rugby AU season.

Reference list

External links
Rugby.com.au profile
itsrugby.co.uk profile

1995 births
Australian sportspeople of Tongan descent
Australian rugby union players
Tongan rugby union players
Living people
Rugby union props
Sydney (NRC team) players
New South Wales Waratahs players